Gonatodes nascimentoi is a species of lizard in the family Sphaerodactylidae. The species is endemic to Brazil.

Etymology
The specific name, nascimentoi, is in honor of Brazilian herpetologist Francisco Paiva do Nascimento.

Geographic range
G. nascimentoi is found in the Brazilian states of Amapá and Pará.

Habitat
The preferred natural habitat of G. nascimentoi is forest.

Description
G. nascimentoi is a large species for its genus.

Behavior
G. nascimentoi is diurnal.

References

Further reading
Ribeiro-Júnior MA (2015). "Catalogue of distribution of lizards (Reptilia: Squamata) from the Brazilian Amazonia. II. Gekkonidae, Phyllodactylidae, Sphaerodactylidae". Zootaxa 3981 (1): 001–055.
Sturaro MJ, Ávila-Pires TCS (2011). "Taxonomic revision of the geckos of the Gonatodes concinnatus complex (Squamata: Sphaerodactylidae), with description of two new species". Zootaxa 2869: 1–36. (Gonatodes nascimentoi, new species, pp. 21–25). (in English, with an abstract in Portuguese).

Gonatodes
Reptiles described in 2011